Bruay-sur-l'Escaut (literally Bruay on the Escaut) is a commune in the Nord department in northern France.

Geography 
Bruay-sur-l'Escaut is 6 km north of Valenciennes on the left bank of the river Scheldt: Bruay-sur-l'Escaut = Bruay on the Scheldt. It is 12 km from the Belgian border at Quiévrain.

Name of the commune 
Named Bruail, Brueil, Bruel, Bruech in the Middle Ages and Bruay afterwards. In 1902 the name was changed to Bruay-sur-l'Escaut in order to avoid confusion with Bruay-la-Buissière in Pas-de-Calais.

Quarters 
Bruay centre
Thiers
Le Pinson
Les Hauts Champs
Le Pont de Bruay
Le Fruitier
Le Rivage
La Folie
La Baillette
Les Ruelles
Le Point du Jour

Population

Heraldry

Economy
At 19th century there are 1300 inhabitants in Bruay, they worked in foundries and glasswares. In Starting from 1856, the inhabitants exploit the subterranean coal veins with a coalmine sunk by the Coalmines Compagny of Anzin ( in French : Compagnie des mines d'Anzin). Afterwards, some houses built and alien  labour forces from Belgium recruited, the population of  Bruay open out to 6000 inhabitants, some breweries and ironmongeries created, today disappeared.

The mine of Thiers 
In 1728, industry, greedy for combustibles, used up all the forest wood around Bruay.  Some drilling to find a coal veins was attempted. The Lagrance coalmine, with low firedamp and a shaft with a depth of 139 metres, created in 1858. Some quicksands and water who invaded the building site (45 cubic metres per second), retarded the workers pending the coalmine construction. The name of the coalmine, Lagrange, descend of the baron Lagrange 's name, who was la Compagnie des mines d'Anzin manager. Starting from 1871 to 1873 the compagny created coalmine houses city around the coalmine (coron in French) to loge the coalmine labour workers. On October 10, 1918 the German soldiers dynamited the coal mine, the water invaded the galleries and the production has been stopped. The exploitation will go back to work in 1919. At this date, a coke firme and generating station created.
The coalmine has been closed in 1954. The slag heap, rich in schist, has been used for the construction of the A2 motorway ( autoroute A2 in French) in 1970 and the easel has been disassembled.

See also
Communes of the Nord department

References

External links 

 The site of this town (in french)

Communes of Nord (French department)